Etoposide-induced protein 2.4 homolog is a protein that in humans is encoded by the EI24 gene.

This gene has higher expression in p53-expressing cells than in control cells and is an immediate-early induction target of p53-mediated apoptosis. The protein encoded by this gene contains six putative transmembrane domains and may suppress cell growth by inducing apoptotic cell death through the caspase 9 and mitochondrial pathways. This gene is located on human chromosome 11q24, a region frequently altered in cancers. Alternative splicing results in two transcript variants encoding different isoforms.

References

Further reading